Protogoniomorpha cytora, the western blue beauty, is a butterfly in the family Nymphalidae. It is found in Guinea, Sierra Leone, Liberia, Ivory Coast, Ghana, Togo, and Benin. The habitat consists of open spaces in primary forests and mature secondary forests.

The larvae feed on Acanthaceae species.

Taxonomy
Protogoniomorpha cytora was first described as member of the genus Junonia, it was then reassigned to the genus Salamis. In the genus Salamis, P. cytora was considered to be a member of the Protogoniomorpha-group, and was moved accordingly into a separate genus following phylogenetic research, although findings point to a close relationship with the present genus Junonia.

References

Junoniini
Butterflies of Africa
Butterflies described in 1847